The Bradynobaenidae are a family of wasps similar to the Mutillidae, differing most visibly in the presence, in females, of a suture separating the pronotum from the mesonotum. These species are often found in arid regions. Recent classifications (beginning in 2008) remove two of the five constituent genera, both from the New World, to a separate family Chyphotidae, thus restricting true bradynobaenids to the Old World.

Genera 
 Apterogyna Latreille, 1809
 Gynecaptera Skorikov, 1935
 Bradynobaenus Spinola, 1851
 Macroocula Panfilov, 1954
 Micatagla Argaman, 1994 (at least 54 living species per Gadallah, et al., 2019)

Genera placed in Chyphotidae 
 Chyphotes Blake, 1886
 Typhoctes Ashmead, 1899

References

External links 

 

Tiphioidea
Apocrita families